Paula Pereira de Bulhões de Carvalho (December 28, 1967 in Salvador, Bahia) is a Brazilian actress.

She is married to the director Marcos Schechtman, with whom he has two children, Júlia and Daniel.

Career

References

External links 

1967 births
Living people
People from Salvador, Bahia
Brazilian telenovela actresses
Brazilian film actresses
Brazilian stage actresses